Grand Bahama Aux AF Airport  is a public use airport located 9 nm east of Grand Bahama, the Bahamas.

See also
List of airports in the Bahamas

References

External links 
 Airport record for Grand Bahama Aux AF Airport at Landings.com

Airports in the Bahamas